Praia da Marinha (in English: Navy Beach or Marinha Beach) is one of the most emblematic beaches of Portugal with a hot-summer Mediterranean climate, located on the Atlantic coast in Caramujeira, part of the Lagoa Municipality, Algarve, and considered by the Michelin Guide as one of the 10 most beautiful beaches in Europe and as one of the 100 most beautiful beaches in the world. In 1998, it was also awarded with the distinguished "Golden Beach" award by the Portuguese Ministry of the Environment because of its outstanding natural qualities. Furthermore, many pictures of this beach have often been used in promotional material and "Guides of Portugal" distributed around the world. The beach itself is fairly small and sandy, and orange limestone cliffs border this famous beach. The beach also has some difficulty to get there, it is a little off the main road and the foot path takes a sharp descent downward.

This beach is not only famous for its cliffs, but also for the quality of the water. Marinha Beach has often been used by international advertising agencies and by television producers in advertising campaigns.

In 2018, the US television network CNN chose Marinha Beach in the Algarve as one of the 20 most beautiful in the world in the category of beaches with cliffs.

In 2019, CNN re-elected Marinha Beach as the Portuguese beach with the award for best spot to visit in September and also as one of the best destinations in the world.

Gallery

References

See also

 Carvoeiro (Lagoa)
 Lagoa, Algarve
 Tourism in Portugal

Beaches of the Algarve